Milesia bigoti is a species of hoverfly in the family Syrphidae.

Distribution
Philippines.

References

Insects described in 1882
Eristalinae
Diptera of Asia
Taxa named by Carl Robert Osten-Sacken